Elko County is a county in the northeastern corner of Nevada, United States. As of the 2020 census, the population was 53,702. Its county seat is Elko. The county was established on March 5, 1869, from Lander County.

Elko County is the fourth-largest county by area in the contiguous United States, ranking lower when the boroughs of Alaska are included.

Elko County is part of the Elko, NV Micropolitan Statistical Area. It contains 49.8 percent of the Duck Valley Indian Reservation, set up in the late 19th century for the Shoshone-Paiute peoples; they are a federally recognized tribe. Although slightly more than 50% of the reservation is across the border in Owyhee County, Idaho, the majority of tribal members live on the Nevada side.

History
This area was long inhabited by Native American tribes of the Plateau, particularly the Western Shoshone, Northern Paiute, and Bannock peoples. Their traditional ways were disrupted after European-American settlement, as the two cultures competed for resources and had differing conceptions of land use and property.

Elko County was established in 1869 from Lander County; the name was taken from the name of the county seat, Elko.

In 1877 what became known as the Duck Valley Indian Reservation was established by presidential executive order for the Western Shoshone in this area, after they signed treaties with the United States. Later the Paiute became involved in the Bannock War, but after they were allowed to return from exile in Washington State, in 1886 another executive order was used to expand the reservation to accommodate them. The federally recognized tribe of the two peoples together conducts farming and ranching in this high desert territory.

The population of the county increased markedly in the late 20th century as the economy improved.

On March 14, 2014, the Bureau of Land Management sold 29 oil and gas leases for $1.27 million to a collection of six companies that included Noble Energy. The transaction was the first such in Nevada.

Geography

Not counting Alaska's boroughs (four of which are also larger), it is the fourth-largest county in area in the United States (behind San Bernardino County, California, Coconino County, Arizona, and Nye County, Nevada). The most topographically prominent mountain in Elko County is Pilot Peak.

The county has three physiographic sections (70% Great Basin section, 20% Payette, 10% Snake River Plain) and 4 watersheds (45% Humboldt River, 30% Upper Snake River, 20% central Nevada desert, 5% Pilot-Thousand Springs).

National protected areas
 Humboldt-Toiyabe National Forest (part)
 Ruby Lake National Wildlife Refuge (part)

Adjacent counties

 Owyhee County, Idaho - northwest/Mountain Time Border
 Twin Falls County, Idaho - north/Mountain Time Border
 Cassia County, Idaho - northeast/Mountain Time Border
 Box Elder County, Utah - east/Mountain Time Border
 Tooele County, Utah - southeast/Mountain Time Border
 White Pine County - south
 Eureka County - southwest
 Lander County - southwest
 Humboldt County - west

Time zones

Except for West Wendover which is in the Mountain Time Zone, the county is in the Pacific Time Zone, though other communities such as Owyhee, Mountain City, Jarbidge and Jackpot unofficially observe Mountain Time as well due to their proximity to, and economic connections with, neighboring areas of Idaho.

Demographics

2000 census
As of the census of 2000, there were 45,291 people, 15,638 households, and 11,493 families living in the county.  The population density was 3/sq mi (1/km2).  There were 18,456 housing units at an average density of 1/sq mi (0/km2).  The racial makeup of the county was 82.04% White, 0.59% Black or African American, 5.30% Native American, 0.68% Asian, 0.11% Pacific Islander, 8.50% from other races, and 2.78% from two or more races.  19.73% of the population were Hispanic or Latino of any race.

There were 15,638 households, out of which 43.00% had children under the age of 18 living with them, 59.30% were married couples living together, 8.40% had a female householder with no husband present, and 26.50% were non-families. 20.90% of all households were made up of individuals, and 4.80% had someone living alone who was 65 years of age or older.  The average household size was 2.85 and the average family size was 3.33.

In the county, the population was spread out, with 32.50% under the age of 18, 8.80% from 18 to 24, 31.50% from 25 to 44, 21.30% from 45 to 64, and 5.90% who were 65 years of age or older.  The median age was 31 years. For every 100 females, there were 108.80 males.  For every 100 females age 18 and over, there were 109.40 males.

The median income for a household in the county was $48,383, and the median income for a family was $52,206. Males had a median income of $41,322 versus $24,653 for females. The per capita income for the county was $18,482.  About 7.00% of families and 8.90% of the population were below the poverty line, including 9.50% of those under age 18 and 7.60% of those age 65 or over.

2010 census
As of the 2010 United States Census, there were 48,818 people, 17,442 households, and 12,441 families living in the county. The racial makeup of the county was 79.4% white, 5.3% Native American, 0.9% Asian, 0.8% black or African American, 0.1% Pacific islander, 10.3% from other races, and 3.2% from two or more races. Those of Hispanic or Latino origin made up 22.9% of the population in terms of ancestry.

Of the 17,442 households, 39.8% had children under the age of 18 living with them, 55.7% were married couples living together, 9.1% had a female householder with no husband present, 28.7% were non-families, and 22.5% of all households were made up of individuals. The average household size was 2.77 and the average family size was 3.26. The median age was 33.4 years.

The median income for a household in the county was $67,038 and the median income for a family was $75,171. Males had a median income of $56,528 versus $34,464 for females. The per capita income for the county was $26,879. About 5.8% of families and 7.1% of the population were below the poverty line, including 8.0% of those under age 18 and 9.0% of those age 65 or over.

Government and politics
Elko is a highly conservative area. In 2011, all eleven of the partisan county officials were Republican.  In the 2004 Presidential Election, George W. Bush won 78% of the county's vote, while 20% voted for John F. Kerry. In 2008 voters in Elko County chose John McCain by 69%, with 28% voting for Barack Obama.

Both former President Jimmy Carter and then-President George W. Bush made visits to the city of Elko during the 2006 mid-term election. William McKinley visited in 1901; Herbert Hoover made his final campaign broadcast as president from a railroad car in Elko in 1932; Franklin D. Roosevelt spoke in Carlin in 1938 during his whistle stop tour; and Barack Obama visited while campaigning in 2008. President Donald Trump arrived in Elko on October 20, 2018, to campaign for Senator Dean Heller during the 2018 midterm elections. In addition, many other high-profile political figures have come to Elko, including former Vice President Dick Cheney. In 2016 Donald Trump Jr. campaigned in Elko during the primary campaign.

Transportation

A number of highways maintained by the Nevada Department of Transportation, some national in prominence, cross Elko County. The county also maintains a network of county routes; however, many of them are unpaved and receive limited, if any, winter maintenance.

Transportation by means other than road vehicle is limited within Elko County. Commercial air service is available only at the Elko Regional Airport in Elko; the only destination currently served is Salt Lake City International Airport.  Other public airports in Elko County include Jackpot Airport, Owyhee Airport and Wells Municipal Airport.

Amtrak passenger service is available from the unstaffed Elko station. Service is via the California Zephyr and is either eastbound or westbound, once a day.

Major highways

  Interstate 80
  Interstate 80 Business (Carlin)
  Interstate 80 Business (Elko)
  Interstate 80 Business (Wells)
  Interstate 80 Business (West Wendover, Nevada–Wendover, Utah)
  U.S. Route 93
  U.S. Route 93 Alternate
  State Route 221
  State Route 223
  State Route 225
  State Route 226
  State Route 227
  State Route 228
  State Route 229
  State Route 230
  State Route 231
  State Route 232
  State Route 233
  State Route 278
  State Route 535
  State Route 766
  State Route 767

Communities

Cities
 Carlin
 Elko (county seat)
 Wells
 West Wendover

Census-designated places

 Jackpot
 Lamoille
 Montello
 Mountain City
 Oasis
 Osino
 Owyhee
 Spring Creek

Unincorporated communities

 Contact
 Currie
 Deeth
 Halleck
 Jack Creek
 Jarbidge
 Jiggs
 Lee
 Midas
 North Fork
 Pleasant Valley
 Ryndon
 Shantytown
 South Fork
 Tuscarora
 Twin Bridges
 Welcome
 Wild Horse

Ghost towns

 Arthur
 Bullion
 Cobre
 Dinner Station
 Hunter
 Huntington
 Metropolis
 Patsville
 Pequop
 San Jacinto
 Shafter

Education
Its school district is the Elko County School District.

See also

 National Register of Historic Places listings in Elko County, Nevada
 Boone Springs Fire

References

External links

 
 Elko County Economic Diversification Authority
 Elko County Library
 Western Folklife Center
 Northeastern Nevada Museum
 Great Basin College
 Northeastern Nevada Regional Hospital
 Elko Daily Free Press

 
Populated places established in 1869
Elko, Nevada micropolitan area
Nevada placenames of Native American origin
1869 establishments in Nevada
Counties in multiple time zones